Actinoptera montana is a species of tephritid or fruit flies in the genus Actinoptera of the family Tephritidae.

Distribution
India, China, Japan, Philippines, Indonesia.

References

Tephritinae
Insects described in 1924
Diptera of Asia